Study after Velázquez is a large 1950 panel painting by the Irish-born English artist Francis Bacon. After Head VI, it is the second of Bacon's long series of paintings influenced by Diego Velázquez's 1650 Portrait of Innocent X. The panel shows a full length view of the pope, engulfed in vertical folds that may be either the linings of a curtain or the bars of a cage.

The folds serve to emphasise the figure's isolation, and were drawn from devices used by Edgar Degas in the late 19th century, which Bacon described as "shuttering". He said that, to him the device meant that the "sensation doesn't come straight out at you but slides slowly and gently across".

The painting was intended as part of a series of Popes for an exhibition at the Hanover Gallery in September 1950. Following a crises of confidence, Bacon withdrew and  destroyed the canvasses he had been working on. A number of works in the series, including this painting, re-emerged in the late 1990s, and are considered among the finest of his output. Before it re-emerged; it was often reproduced, tantalisingly, from a black and white photograph.

References

Sources
Arya, Rina. "Painting the Pope: An Analysis of Francis Bacon's Study After Velazquez's Portrait of Innocent X". Literature and Theology, volume 23, No. 1, 2009. 
 Davies, Hugh & Yard, Sally, Francis Bacon. (New York) Cross River Press. 
 Dawson, Barbara; Sylvester, David. Francis Bacon in Dublin. London: Thames & Hudson, 2000. 
 Farr, Dennis; Peppiatt, Michael; Yard, Sally. Francis Bacon: A Retrospective. NY: Harry N Abrams, 1999. 

1950 paintings
Modern paintings
Paintings by Francis Bacon
Innocent X